Haplolambda is an extinct genus of pantodont mammals in the family Barylambdidae from the Paleocene of North America, containing two species: H. quinni known from Colorado and H. simpsoni from Utah.

References

Pantodonts
Fossil taxa described in 1939
Paleocene mammals of North America
Prehistoric mammal genera